Wake Up to Life (Spanish:Despertar a la vida) is a 1945 Argentine drama film directed by Mario Soffici and starring Elisa Christian Galvé, Roberto Airaldi and Francisco de Paula. de Paula won a Silver Condor award for his performance.

Synopsis
A doctor begins a romance with a young woman which almost has tragic consequences.

Cast
 Elisa Christian Galvé 
 Roberto Airaldi 
 Francisco de Paula 
 Tilda Thamar 
 Lea Conti 
 Hugo Pimentel 
 Leticia Scury 
 Francisco Pablo Donadío 
 Hugo Palomero 
 Humberto de la Rosa 
 Humberto Ferradaz Campos 
 Ana Nieves

References

Bibliography 
 Hammer, Tad. International film prizes: an encyclopedia. Garland, 1991 .

External links
 

1945 films
1945 drama films
Argentine drama films
1940s Spanish-language films
Argentine black-and-white films
Films directed by Mario Soffici
1940s Argentine films